Chinakurali is a village in Pandavapura, Mandya, Karnataka, India.

Location
Chinakurali village is located between Pandavapura and Krishnarajpet towns in Southern Karnataka. The village is located 1`2 km away from Pandavapura town.

Demographics
The village has a population of 12000 people as per the 2011 census. The area of the village is 398 hectares.

Administration
Chinakurali villages is part of Pandavapura Taluk in Mandya district. The village is 137 km from the state capital of Bangalore.

Nearby places
 Lingapura, 1 km
 Kumbarakoppalu, 1 km
 Chikka Boganahalli, 2 km
 Kanganahalli, 2 km

Post office
There is a post office in Chinakurali and the postal code is  571455. The post office comes under Mandya Head Post Office.

Gallery

See also
 Gummanahalli
 Krishnarajpet
 Pandavapura

References

Villages in Mandya district